The Battle of Cathair Cuan refers to a perhaps extended conflict fought in or between 977 and 978, or simply to a single battle in one or the other year, in Munster in Ireland. Attacking were Brian Bóruma and the Dál gCais, while defending were Donnubán mac Cathail and the remainder of the Viking army of Limerick. The latter were probably the followers of the newly elected and final King of the Foreigners of Munster Harald Ivarsson, son of the recently slain Ivar of Limerick, although it is possible Donnubán was in overall command. 

Brian and the Dál gCais were victorious, with the result that the Limerick lordship and its territories were decisively lost to the Gaels until the Norman invasion of Ireland. Much had already been lost to the Dál gCais by 977, probably including the great dún of Limerick itself, but the lordship included other territories, some a number of miles inland, and the Norse-Irish themselves appear to have briefly remained viable in these. Aralt was probably slain in the conflict but Donnubán seems to have survived. Later accounts state he also was killed.

Annallistic accounts 
According to the Annals of Inisfallen:

According to the Annals of the Four Masters:

According to the early 12th century Cogad Gáedel re Gallaib:

The 18th century compilation known as the Dublin Annals of Inisfallen report another tradition of uncertain provenance. Here Aralt has been replaced by a certain Olaf, possibly his brother, who was actually killed a little before along with his father Ivar and third brother Dubcenn, on Inis Cathaig in 977.

One final source, now lost but used by John Collins of Myross in the late 18th or early 19th century, reports:

Croom Castle was in fact a principal fortress of the O'Donovan family in the 12th century but it is unknown how early they came into possession of the stretch of the River Maigue on which it is located. Possibly Collins was making an assumption but this is unverifiable. A form of the name Cathair Cuan survived at least as late as the year 1200, where it appears in a Norman survey of the region as Cathircuain, which unfortunately cannot be associated with any known modern site.

Notes

References

Primary sources
 Annals of the Four Masters, ed. & tr. John O'Donovan (2nd ed., 1856), Annála Rioghachta Éireann. Annals of the Kingdom of Ireland by the Four Masters... with a Translation and Copious Notes. 7 vols. Dublin: Royal Irish Academy.CELT versions. Full scans at Internet Archive: Vol. I. Vol. II. Vol. III. Vol. IV. Vol. V. Vol. VI. Indices.
 Annals of Inisfallen, ed. & tr. Seán Mac Airt (1944), The Annals of Inisfallen (MS. Rawlinson B. 503). Dublin: DIAS. Electronic edition and translation at CELT.
 Calendar of Documents, Relating to Ireland. 1171–1251. Ed. Henry Savage Sweetman (1875). London.
 Cogad Gáedel re Gallaib, ed. & tr. Todd, James Henthorn (1867). Cogadh Gaedhel re Gallaibh: The War of the Gaedhil with the Gaill. London: Longmans.
  Dublin Annals of Inisfallen, John O'Brien and John Conry (circa 1765). Edition and Latin translation by Charles O'Conor (1825), Rerum Hibernicarum Scriptores, Volume II.
Secondary sources
 Downham, Clare, Viking Kings of Britain and Ireland: The Dynasty of Ívarr to A.D. 1014. Edinburgh: Dunedin Academic Press. 2007.
 Ní Mhaonaigh, Máire, "Cogad Gáedel Re Gallaib and the Annals: A Comparison", in Ériu 47 (1996): 101–26. JSTOR
 Ó Corráin, Donnchadh, "The Vikings in Ireland", in Anne-Christine Larsen (ed.), The Vikings in Ireland. Roskilde: The Viking Ship Museum. 2001.
 Steenstrup, Johannes C. H. R., Normannerne, Vols. 3–4. Copenhagen: Forlagt af Rudolph Klein, I. Cohens Bogtrykkeri. 1882. alternative scan

Cathair Cuan
Cathair Cuan
Cathair Cuan
Cathair Cuan
O'Brien dynasty
O'Donovan family
History of County Limerick
977
978
10th century in Ireland
Cathair Cuan
Cathair Cuan
Viking Age in Ireland